The 2015–16 Missouri Tigers men's basketball team represented the University of Missouri in the 2015–16 NCAA Division I men's basketball season. Their head coach was Kim Anderson, who was in his second year as the head coach at Missouri. The team played its home games at Mizzou Arena in Columbia, Missouri, and played its fourth season in the Southeastern Conference. They finished the season 10–21, 3–15 in SEC play to finish in last place. Due to a self-imposed postseason ban, Missouri did not participate in the SEC tournament.

Previous season 
The Tigers finished the 2014–15 season 9–23, 3–15 in SEC play to finish in last place in conference. They lost in the first round of the SEC tournament to South Carolina.

Season
Missouri was coming off a disappointing 2014-15 season that saw the Tigers end the year 9–23, 3–15 in SEC play, to finish in last place. They lost in the first round of the SEC tournament to South Carolina.

On January 13, 2016, Missouri announced that it was self-imposing a ban from postseason play in 2016 due to violations committed under the previous head coach, Frank Haith. Missouri vacated all wins from the 2013-14 season and will lose one of its men's basketball scholarships in 2015-16 and another no later than the 2017-18 season.

On February 16, 2016, Missouri announced that junior guard Wes Clark was "no longer a member of the men's basketball program," just minutes before their game against South Carolina.

Departures

2015 Recruits

Roster

Schedule and results

|-
!colspan=12 style="background:black; color:white;"| Exhibition

|-
!colspan=12 style="background:black; color:white;"| Non-conference regular season

|-
!colspan=12 style="background:black; color:white;"| SEC regular season

References

Missouri Tigers men's basketball seasons
Missouri
Tiger
Tiger